Harry Madison McCaskrin (August 26, 1873 – April 10, 1942) was an American lawyer and politician.

Background
McCaskrin was born in Rantoul, Illinois. He graduated from Rantoul High School. McCaskrin received his bachelor's degree from University of Illinois and his law degree from University of Michigan Law School. He practiced law in Rock Island, Illinois. He served in the Illinois House of Representatives from 1921 to 1941 and was a Republican. McCaskin died at his home in Rock Island, Illinois. His wife Hazel also served in the Illinois House of Representatives.

References

External links

1873 births
1942 deaths
People from Rantoul, Illinois
Politicians from Rock Island, Illinois
University of Illinois alumni
University of Michigan Law School alumni
Illinois lawyers
Republican Party members of the Illinois House of Representatives